George Peter (November 28, 1829 – Augustus 9, 1893) was a Democrat American politician in the state of Maryland.

George Peter was born in Montgomery County, Maryland, to politician George Peter and Sarah Norfleet Freeland. He followed in his father's footsteps and became a delegate to the Maryland constitutional convention in 1864. In 1878 he became a member of the Maryland State Senate, which he remained until 1888. In 1888 he also became president of the Senate.

He died in 1893, location unknown, and was buried in Oak Hill Cemetery, Washington D.C. He was the father of Arthur Peter (1873-1943), who also became a Maryland politician.

References

1829 births
1893 deaths
Democratic Party members of the Maryland House of Delegates
Presidents of the Maryland State Senate
Democratic Party Maryland state senators
Burials at Oak Hill Cemetery (Washington, D.C.)
19th-century American politicians